Luis Vidal (born 1969) is a Spanish architect. He is best known for projects with his practice, luis vidal+architects, such as Heathrow Airport T2, Zaragoza Airport, Álvaro Cunqueiro Hospital, Castellana 77 offices, Loyola University Campus and Matta Sur Community Center and CESFAM.

Early life and education

Vidal was born in Barcelona on January 16, 1969. He studied Architecture at Greenwich University in the United Kingdom, from where he graduated in 1994. In 1995 he became a member of RIBA. He is also a member of :es:Colegio de Arquitectos de Madrid (COAM) and American Institute of Architects of New York City (AIA).

Career
He was project director for the new Terminal 4 at Madrid's Barajas Airport as well as being coauthor of the Warsaw International Airport in Poland. In 2004 he opened his architectural practice in Madrid, Luis Vidal+Architecs (LVA). He soon established a cooperation with Rogers Stirk Harbour + Partners (RSH+P) and both practices began collaborating in common projects such as Campus Palmas Altas in Seville (RIBA European Award 2010).
 
He was the lead concept architect of Heathrow Airport Terminal 2, which opened in June 2014. Among his other works are Zaragoza Airport (Spain), the new Álvaro Cunqueiro Hospital in Vigo (Spain), Can Misses Hospital in Ibiza (Spain), Castellana 77 (Spain) and Colon Towers (Spain) modernization. He is also the first Spanish architect to design a space port, Front Range, in Denver, Colorado, in association with HDR. Other projects of Vidal’s practice include several international airports in major U.S. cities including Pittsburgh, Boston and Dallas.
 
Vidal has been part-time lecturer at the :es:Escuela Técnica Superior de Arquitectura (ETSAM) of the Universidad Politécnica de Madrid. He is currently a member of the Industry Advisory Board at the Cranfield University in London.

Works

 Community Center + CESFAM Matta Sur. Santiago. Chile. (2015-2021)
 Loyola University Campus. Seville. Spain. (2015-2019)
 Castellana 77 offices. Madrid. Spain. (2015-2017) 
 Botín Art Center (with RPWB). Santander. Spain.
 New Hospital Álvaro Cunqueiro. Vigo, Spain. (2010-2015)
 Terminal 2 at Heathrow Airport. London, United Kingdom. (2008-2014)
 Can Misses Hospital. Ibiza, Spain. (2008-2014)
 Eloy Gonzalo 10 Building refurbishment. Madrid (2014)
 Fit out :es:Campus Palmas Altas (Sevilla). Seville. Spain. (with RSHP) (2008-2012)
 Campus Palmas Altas offices. Seville, Spain. (con RSHP) (2005-2009)
 Abengoa Bridge. Seville, Spain. (with RSHP) (2009)
 Zaragoza Airport. Spain. (2005-2008)
 Infanta Leonor Hospital. Madrid (2005-2007)
 Fit out MNCARS Restaurant, Madrid (2004-2005)

Underway projects

 Pittsburgh International Airport New Terminal. Pittsburgh. U.S.
 Fit Out Castellana, 33 Building, Madrid. Spain.
 Comodoro Arturo Merino Benítez Internacional Airport refurbishment and new Terminal and Control Tower. Santiago de Chile. Chile.

References

 Her Majesty The Queen set to officially open the new Terminal 2 on 23 June 2014
 Luis Vidal
 Open House Madrid Home
 Can airports be beautiful?
 Plane thinking at Heathrow
 Follow News
 luis vidal + architects completes can misses hospital in ibiza, spain
 El arquitecto Luis Vidal - Fuera de Serie

Spanish architects
1969 births
Living people